is a trans-Neptunian object orbiting beyond Pluto in the Kuiper belt of the outermost Solar System, approximately  in diameter. It was discovered on 8 October 1996, by astronomers David Jewitt, Chad Trujillo, Jane Luu, and Jun Chen at the Mauna Kea Observatory, Hawaii, in the United States. It was the first discovery of a twotino.

Orbit and classification 

It orbits the Sun at a distance of 28.6–66.6 AU once every 328 years and 8 months (120,032 days). Its orbit has an eccentricity of 0.40 and an inclination of 12° with respect to the ecliptic.  Near perihelion, it comes closer to the Sun than Neptune does (29.7 AU). It has a semi-major axis (average distance from the Sun) near the edge of the classical belt.

Twotino 

 was the first twotino discovered. Twotinos stay in a 1:2 orbital resonance with Neptune, which means that for every one orbit a twotino makes, Neptune orbits two times. Both the Minor Planet Center and the Deep Ecliptic Survey list this trans-Neptunian object as a twotino.

Numbering and naming 

This minor planet was numbered by the Minor Planet Center on 9 January 2001. As of 2018, it has not been named.

References

External links 
 
 

020161
020161
Discoveries by David C. Jewitt
Discoveries by Chad Trujillo
Discoveries by Jane Luu
Discoveries by Jun Chen (astronomer)
19961008